Hana Vejvodová (11. July 1963, Prague–1. August 1994, Prague) was a Czech pianist and composer. She studied piano with Jaromir Kriz and composition with Ilja Hurnik, Svatopluk Havelka and Franco Donatoni.

Works
Vejvodova composed 40 works for orchestra, voice and solo instruments. Selected works include:

Orchestral compositions: 
Serenade for Strings
Passacaglia for Symphony Orchestra (1986)
Deliranda  – symphonic movement (1988–89)
Arkanum – symphonic movement (1991–92)
Concerto for Piano and Chamber Orchestra (1992–93)

Chamber compositions: 
Suite for Three Clarinets in B-flat (1985)
Duets for flute and violin
Wind Quartet
Elegy for violin and organ
Trio for Two flutes and Piano
Brass Quintet (1988)
Suite for oboe and piano
Sonata for oboe and piano (1991)

Piano compositions: 
Five Piano Sketches
Etude
Sonatinas No. 1, 2, 3
Sonata in C (1984)
Sonata for four hands (1985)
Partita Bizzara
'Sonata No. 2 "Confession" (1988–90),
Ten Miniatures
Eight Bagatelles (1993)
Sonata No. 3 "Tribute to Nature" (1993–94)
Sonata No. 4 "Fate" (1994)
 
Vocal music: 
Song of the Slain Lover
Chants about the Death of an Empire, for mixed choir (1988)
Fairy-tale for mixed choir
Cycle of Three Love Song
Pathways of Love for higher voice and piano
 
Music for children: 
Bouquet of Flowers (cycle of five songs for the youngest children)
Watercolour Paintings (seven miniatures for piano, 1988)
Animals' Ball (piano suite)

References

External links 

1963 births
1994 deaths
20th-century classical composers
Czech classical composers
Czech music educators
Women classical composers
Women music educators
20th-century women composers